Walter Espec (died 1153) was a prominent military and judicial figure of the reign of Henry I of England. 

His father was probably William Speche (William Espec), who joined William the Conqueror in the Norman conquest of England. The senior Speche is believed to have become the feudal baron of Old Wardon by 1086.

In the years up to 1120, Espec controlled northern England, alongside Eustace fitz John. He was the builder of Helmsley Castle; he built also Wark Castle. As an old man, when High Sheriff of Yorkshire, he fought against the Scots at the Battle of the Standard in 1138. He was the founder of Kirkham Priory (Augustinians) and later Rievaulx Abbey (Cistercians). Kirkham Priory was founded around 1130. He then donated  to Rievaulx, where building started in 1132, and is largely credited for the arrival of the Cistercians in England. By 1135 he also founded Warden Abbey (Wardon) in Bedfordshire, a daughter house of Rievaulx. Walter Espec later became a Cistercian monk himself.

References
Concise Dictionary of National Biography
 Paul Dalton, "Espec, Walter (d. 1147x58)", Oxford Dictionary of National Biography, Oxford University Press, 2004.
 Janet E. Burton, The monastic order in Yorkshire, 1069–1215, Cambridge studies in medieval life and thought, Cambridge University Press, 1999, 352 pages. .
 A. Gransden, Historical Writing in England c. 550–c.1307, 1974.
 Christopher Tyerman, " Walter Espec", in Who's Who in Early Medieval England, 1066–1272, Shepheard-Walwyn (editor), 1996, p. 113–114..

Notes

External links
 Four Great Abbeys and Priories of Yorkshire
 Walter Espec, founder of Rievaulx abbey.

1153 deaths
Anglo-Normans
Norman warriors
People from North Yorkshire
High Sheriffs of Yorkshire
Year of birth unknown